The men's 1500 metres race of the 2013–14 ISU Speed Skating World Cup 1, arranged in the Olympic Oval, in Calgary, Alberta, Canada, was held on 8 November 2013.

Koen Verweij of the Netherlands won, while Shani Davis of the United States came third, and Kjeld Nuis of the Netherlands came third. Brian Hansen of the United States won Division B.

Results
The race took place on Friday, 8 November, with Division A scheduled in the morning session, at 13:13, and Division B scheduled in the afternoon session, at 16:39.

Division A

Division B

References

Men 1500
1